Cornufer nexipus, commonly known as the Baining wrinkled ground frog, is a species of frog in the family Ceratobatrachidae.
It is endemic to Papua New Guinea.

Its natural habitat is subtropical or tropical moist lowland forests.

References

nexipus
Amphibians of Papua New Guinea
Taxonomy articles created by Polbot
Amphibians described in 1975